Homalium kunstleri is a species of plant in the family Salicaceae. It is a tree endemic to Peninsular Malaysia. It is threatened by habitat loss.

References

kunstleri
Endemic flora of Peninsular Malaysia
Trees of Peninsular Malaysia
Vulnerable plants
Taxonomy articles created by Polbot